Florence Ladd (born 1932) is the Director Emeritus of the Bunting Institute and the author of the novel Sarah's Psalm.

Biography
Ladd was born on June 16, 1932, in Washington, D.C. Her parents were both educators and she grew up in Washington, D.C. She attended Howard University, graduating in 1953 and then the  University of Rochester, earning a Ph.D. in psychology in 1958.

Ladd began her academic career teaching at Simmons College in Boston. She then taught at Harvard University's graduate school. In 1977 began working at the Massachusetts Institute of Technology (MIT) where she became involved with administration and served as dean at the MIT School of Architecture. She was the dean of students at Wellesley College until 1984.

Ladd left academia for a time, working at Oxfam America as well as the South African Education Program for the Institute of International Education and the School for International Training.

In 1989 she became the director of the Bunting Institute at Harvard University, a position she held until 1997. She is now Director Emeritus. In 1994 Ladd served on the executive committee for the conference Black Women in the Academy: Defending Our Name 1894-1994 held at MIT.

In 1996 Ladd's novel Sarah's Psalm was published by Charles Scribner's Sons. It won the 1997 Black Caucus of the American Library Association's literary award for fiction. In 1998 Ladd was the recipient of a MacDowell fellowship.

In 2008 Stephen E. Coit painted Ladd's portrait. It hangs in Lowell House at Harvard.

References

1932 births
Living people
People from Washington, D.C.
20th-century African-American women
20th-century African-American people